Sangkhom is the westernmost district (amphoe) of Nong Khai province, northeastern Thailand.

Geography
Neighboring districts are (from the east clockwise): Si Chiang Mai and Pho Tak of Nong Khai Province; Na Yung of Udon Thani province; and Pak Chom of Loei province. To the north across the Mekong River is the Lao province Vientiane Prefecture.

History
Originally the area was a tambon of Tha Bo district, which became part of the newly established Si Chiang Mai district on 4 August 1958. It was established as a minor district (king amphoe) on 1 March 1966, and upgraded to a full district on 16 November 1971. From 14 November 1975 to 14 November 1978 the district was under military administration as part of a military operation.

Symbols
The district slogan is "Naga Fireball Festival; famous dried bananas; golden beaches".

Administration
The district is divided into five sub-districts (tambons), which are further subdivided into 36 villages (mubans). Sangkhom is a township (thesaban tambon) which covers parts of tambons Sangkhom and Kaeng Kai. There are a further five tambon administrative organizations (TAO).

References

External links
amphoe.com

Sangkhom